Roncalli was a German television series. It was the title of a six-part program that aired on ARD, with Günther Maria Halmer and Günter Lamprecht, which was produced for ARD from 1986 to 1987, in collaboration with Bernhard Paul and the artists of Circus Roncalli.

It was first broadcast on December 8, 1986.

See also
List of German television series

References

External links
 

1986 German television series debuts
1987 German television series endings
Circus television shows
German-language television shows
Das Erste original programming